The Belgium men's national water polo team is the representative for Belgium in international men's water polo. The team has participated in eleven tournaments at the Summer Olympics.

Results

Olympic Games

1900 —  Silver medal
1908 —  Silver medal
1912 —  Bronze medal
1920 —  Silver medal
1924 —  Silver medal
1928 — 6th place
1936 —  Bronze medal
1948 — 4th place
1952 — 6th place
1960 — 16th place
1964 — 7th place

See also
 Belgium men's Olympic water polo team records and statistics

References

 
Men's national water polo teams
Men's sport in Belgium